Mohammad Yasin (born 10 April 1992) is a Pakistani cricketer. He made his first-class debut for Pakistan International Airlines in the 2016–17 Quaid-e-Azam Trophy on 29 October 2016.

References

External links
 

1992 births
Living people
Pakistani cricketers
Pakistan International Airlines cricketers
People from Malakand District